One of the earliest twentieth century multiday races was the inaugural Trans-American Footrace, which took place in 1928 starting at Legion Ascot Speedway in Los Angeles and finishing in New York City in Madison Square Garden for a distance of .

Out of the 199 runners who left Los Angeles on March 4, 1928, at 3:30 p.m., only 55 runners finished on May 26, 1928. The race took 84 days to run from coast to coast.  Andy Payne, who won the event in 573 hours, 4 minutes, 34 seconds.  It was called the Bunion Derby by newspapers and was also held in 1929.  The race was organized by C. C. Pyle.

Johnny Salo, who finished in 2nd place in 1928 and in 1st place in 1929, became the fastest person to twice run across the continental United States in consecutive years.

Recent races
A coast-to-coast race has taken place several times since, including four races organized by Jessie Dale Riley and Michael Kenney from 1992 to 1995. Alan Firth organised two events in 2002 and 2004.

In 2011 ultrarunner Serge Girard planned a new edition running from Los Angeles to New York starting June 19 and lasting for 70 days.

On May 20, 2012, ultrarunner John Pyle completed a run from San Francisco to Key West. His run began on February 29, 2012.

On August 18, 2012, ultrarunner Jennifer Bradley became the second British woman to cross America on foot but the first to run across and make it in 80 days during the Run Across America on Trail 2012. Her trip started May 31, 2012, at Twin Harbors State Park in Washington, and she was on the trail 720 hours 26.7 minutes.

He was on trail 719 hours 47.2 minutes.

On June 2, 2015, British ultra runner Robert HP Young won the 2015 Race Across USA footrace with a time of 482 hours 10 minutes. Young subsequently attempted a solo run across the U.S. in 2016 to break the crossing record, though stopped part-way. Investigations concluded that his time could not have been a true reflection of his performance, and he was dropped by his sponsors.

References
Williams, Geoff. C.C. Pyle's Amazing Foot Race: The True Story of the 1928 Coast-to-Coast Run Across America. July 10, 2007.

External links
Serge Girard - LA to New York
Documentary information
Trans America 2011
Run Across America on Trail 2012
2015 Race Across USA	
Robert Young - Marathon Man UK

Multiday races
Ultramarathons in the United States